Ben van Beneden is the director of the Rubenshuis (Rubens House), the former home and studio of Peter Paul Rubens in Antwerp, Belgium, and an authority on the art of Rubens.

Selected publications
Room for art in Seventeenth-century Antwerp. 2009. (With Ariane van Suchtelen) 
 Rubens maverick artist: The master's theoretical notebook, The Rubenianum Quarterly Antwerp, 2013. 
 Anthony van Dyck in Genoa, "The Rubenianum Quarterly", Vol. 2014, No. 4.

References 

Dutch art curators
Peter Paul Rubens
Dutch art historians
Living people
Year of birth missing (living people)